Paul Alexander may refer to:

 Paul Alexander (British writer), British comedy writer
 Paul Alexander, former surgeon-general of Australia's Joint Health Command
 Paul E. Alexander, Canadian health researcher
 Paul Lir Alexander (born ), Brazilian drug lord

Americans
 Paul Alexander (American football) (born 1960), American coach
 Paul Alexander (artist) (1937–2021), American commercial artist and illustrator
 Paul Alexander (polio survivor) (born 1946), American lawyer and paralytic polio survivor
 Paul Jacob Alexander (1904–1969), newspaper publisher and Seattle City Councilman
 Paul Alexander, musician with the American folk rock band Midlake